Empfangshalle (literally lobby) is the name of a German performing art duo. It was founded by Corbinian Böhm and Michael Gruber in Munich (Germany) in 1995.

Medium of their works is the society. They perform their art projects in the open, especially in popular places. Their art projects - more often than not - are a mystery to the viewers and often cause confusion. A typical example was the staged "Gei hin hol" [gei: hi:n ho:l] mega-poster action with incomprehensible foreign language messages in Munich (2005).

Exhibitions and projects 
(listed in chronological order)
 1998:
 "Pagine per la Libertà", Pisa, Italy
 "Sag lächelnd Good Bye" (say good bye with a smile), Old North Cemetery of Munich, Germany
 Skulpturenprojekt (project with sculptures), Alentejo, Portugal
 1999:
 "Play", Old North Cemetery of Munich, Germany
 2000:
 "Drei-Sekunden" (three seconds), on the ramp in front of the Empfangshalle studio, Munich, Germany
 "Empfangshalle macht sich ein Bild" (Empfangshalle gets an impression), Haus der Kunst, Munich, Germany
 "Himmelfahrt" (ascension), Diocesan Museum, Freising, Germany
 "Laden und Löschen" (loading and deleting), Piazza, Munich literary house, Germany
 "Move me", subway entrances in Munich, Nuremberg and Berlin, Germany
 "Open Art", Maximiliansforum, Munich, Germany
 "Qualitätswochen" (quality weeks), state art gallery of Baden-Baden, Germany
 2001:
 "Bitte melde Dich" (please call back ...), Brooklyn Bridge, New York City
 "Loch" (hole), joint project with Haubitz&Zoche
 "Kabûl Salonu", Istanbul, Turkey
 2002:
 "Auf kürzestem Weg" (taking the shortest way possible), artists’ gallery ('Galerie der Künstler'), Munich, Germany
 "Auftraggeber mit Öffentlichkeit" (customer with public), Munich, Germany
 "Gelsenlos" (Gelsen(kirchen) lottery ticket)", Overtures, Gelsenkirchen, Germany
 2003:
 "Cape of Good Hope", an art project in public space, Kuopio, Finland
 "Woher Kollege Wohin Kollege" (buddy, where do you come from, where are you going), an art project in public space, Munich, Germany
 Werkschau (exhibition of works), Kunsthaus Raskolnikow, Dresden, Germany
 2004:
 premiere of "Woher Kollege Wohin Kollege" buddy, where do you come from, where are you going), a documentary film of the same name as the art project, municipal museum, Munich, Germany
 "Brot und Butter" (bread and butter), municipal gallery in the Höhmannhaus, Augsburg, Germany
 "Schichtwechsel" (change of shift), hall 13, cotton spinning-mill ('Baumwollspinnerei'), Leipzig, Germany
 2005:
 "Gei hin hol", [gei: hi:n ho:l], an art project in public space with mega-posters, Munich, Germany
 "Ein Kreuz für das 21. Jahrhundert" (a cross for the 21st century), diocesan museum, Freising, Germany
 "Willkommen in Leipzig" (welcome to Leipzig), together with Medium Green ('zwischengrün'), art association of Leipzig, Germany
 "Klopstockstr. Haus 6" (Klopstock street No 6), Petulapark, Munich, Germany
 2006:
 "Eröffnungsausstellung H2 - Zentrum für Gegenwartskunst" (opening exhibition H2), Augsburg, Germany
 "as if we were alone", 'Ars Electronica', Linz, Austria (August 31 – September 5)
 "Klopstockstr. Haus 6", Petulapark Munich
 "Image Flux: China, Guangzhou  	
 "as if we were alone", Filmfest München
 2007:
 "Mobile journey", 52nd Venice Biennale  	
 Fototriennale, Esslingen 	
 "Woher Kollege wohin Kollege", "urban stories", Berlin
 2008:
 "Camp Berlin", Berlin
 "Werkschau", Kunsthaus Raskolnikow, and public space in Dresden
 "Paradoxien des Öffentlichen", Wilhelm Lehmbruck Museum, Duisburg
 "seesaw", Dina4, studio, Berlin
 "3+2=4" DG Deutsche Gesellschaft für christliche Kunst, Munich
 "Golden Gate" Kunst am Bau project, Neues Schulzentrum, Fürstenfeldbruck
 "Seaplay" China Cup, installation work on the beach, Shenzhen
 "Wanderarbeiter" Shenzhen, video work and performance along with workers
 2009:
 "Art on Site" NCCA Moskau and Goethe-Institut, Kaliningrad, Russia
 "Beauty and the beast" 3rd Moscow Biennale, Russia
 "Kunst zur Arbeit" Opelvillen, Rüsselsheim
 "The Benjamin Project" Gallery Diet, Miami, United States
 "Paradiso" Diocesan Museum, Freising, Germany
 "Wanderarbeiter" Shenzhen, video work and performance with workers
 2010:
 "The Benjamin Project", single exhibition, He Xiangning Art Museum, Shenzen, China
 2011:
 "Hinterm Horizont", realization of the "Kunst am Bau" concept for the Justizvollzugsanstalt Heidering, Berlin, Germany
 "taggen" at the KIOSK FRee, Sendlinger Tor, Munich, Germany
 "Isar Peak", within the scope of "transformations", Galerie Kampl, Munich, Germany
 2012:
 "arabian countdown", temporary work in the Rotunda of the Pinakothek der Moderne, Munich, Germany

Awards and nominations 
 1999: Kestler-Häusler-Stiftung sponsorship award
 2001:
 Erwin-und-Gisela-von-Steiner-Stiftung scholarship
 1st, "Kunst am Bau" competition, Munich East work yard planning
 2002: Debutant of the Bundesverband Bildender Künstlerinnen und Künstler, Munich, and of Bavaria
 2003: Art prize of the Fürstenfeldbruck district
 2004: Young CIVIS media prize nomination of the "Woher Kollege Wohin Kollege" film, Vienna
 2006: "der hausderkunst preis", Haus der Kunst art prize, Munich
 2008: Erwin-und-Gisela-von-Steiner-Stiftung scholarship for the "Benjamin project"

External links 
 Empfangshalle

References 

German artists
Art duos
1995 in Germany